Vitamin S may refer to:

 Salicylic acid, although not a vitamin, is sometimes called "vitamin S"
 a song by Jamaican dancehall musician Cham from his album Ghetto Story
 slang for anabolic steroids, particularly when illicitly provided and/or taken